Philip Plummer Jr. is a Republican member of the Ohio House of Representatives, representing the 39th House District. Plummer also serves as the Chairman of the Montgomery County Republican Party. Plummer previously served as Sheriff of Montgomery County, Ohio for over 10 years from 2008 to 2018.

Life and career
Phil Plummer joined the Montgomery County Sheriff's office in 1988 as a corrections officer, and was later promoted to Deputy Sheriff, and eventually earned the rank of Sergeant. In November 2000 Plummer was promoted to the rank of Major. In January 2004 he was placed in charge of Personnel Office. Later in March 2005 Plummer earned the promotion to Chief Deputy. Following the resignation of Sheriff David Vore, Plummer was appointed to the office to fill out the remainder of the term.

Plummer spends his spare time as an assistant coach for the Butler High School wrestling team.

Plummer has a brother who is a security guard at Miami Valley Career Technology Center

Ohio House of Representatives
In the 2018 Election, incumbent for the 40th District, Michael Henne was unable to run again due to term limits. Phil Plummer decided to run, and won an uncontested primary to become the Republican nominee. He then beat Ryan Taylor. On December 31, 2018 Plummer resigned as Sheriff in order to be sworn in on January 3, 2019 as State Representative.

In 2019, Plummer was made Vice Chair of Criminal Justice Committee for the 133rd General Assembly.

In 2019, Plummer co-sponsored legislation that would ban abortion in Ohio and criminalize what they called "abortion murder". Doctors who performed abortions in cases of ectopic pregnancy and other life-threatening conditions would be exempt from prosecution only if they "[took] all possible steps to preserve the life of the unborn child, while preserving the life of the woman. Such steps include, if applicable, attempting to reimplant an ectopic pregnancy into the woman's uterus". Reimplantation of an ectopic pregnancy is not a recognized or medically feasible procedure.

Electoral history

References

External links
 Representative Phil Plummer (official site)

21st-century American politicians
Living people
Ohio sheriffs
Republican Party members of the Ohio House of Representatives
University of Phoenix alumni
University of Toledo alumni
Year of birth missing (living people)